Eliza Myrie (born 1981) is a visual artist who lives and works in Chicago, IL. Myrie works in a variety of media including sculpture, participatory installation art, public art, and printmaking.

Early life and education 
Myrie's father is a stonemason. Myrie received her MFA from Northwestern University and her BA from Williams College. Myrie was a participant at The Skowhegan School and The Whitney Independent Study Program.

Art career 
Myrie co-founded the Black Artists Retreat (2013-2016) with Theaster Gates, underwritten by the Rebuild Foundation, that gathered an intergenerational group of black visual artists outside of traditional art institutions. In winter 2016, Myrie was awarded a MacDowell fellowship. In 2017/2018, Myrie held the Equal Justice Residency/Fellowship at the Santa Fe Art Institute. Myrie is the Wiki Project Manager at Black Lunch Table.

Teaching 
Myrie has taught at the School of the Art Institute of Chicago and Williams College.

Selected exhibitions 

 Davidson Contemporary, New York (2010)
 Hyde Park Arts Center, Chicago (2010)
 New Museum of Contemporary Art, New York (2011)
 Museum of Contemporary Art Chicago, Chicago (2012)
 Roots and Culture, Chicago (2014)
 Shane Campbell, Chicago (2016)
 Vox Populi, Philadelphia (2016)

Awards 

 LeRoy Neiman and Janet Byrne Neiman ARTADIA Awardee - Chicago, 2020

References

External links 
 Labrish, and other words - interview with Eliza Myrie - Newfound publisher - Austin, TX

American women artists
Living people
African-American women artists
Wikipedia people
Skowhegan School of Painting and Sculpture alumni
Williams College alumni
Northwestern University alumni
1981 births
21st-century African-American people
20th-century African-American people
20th-century African-American women
21st-century African-American women